Nocardioides intraradicalis is a Gram-positive, non-spore-forming and non-motile bacterium from the genus Nocardioides which has been isolated from the roots of the plant Psammosilene tunicoides from Gejiu, China.

References

External links
Type strain of Nocardioides intraradicalis at BacDive -  the Bacterial Diversity Metadatabase

 

intraradicalis
Bacteria described in 2016